Egrisi Range, also known as the Samegrelo Range (სამეგრელოს ქედი) or the Odishi Range (ოდიშის ქედი), is an east–west mountain range that runs parallel to the Greater Caucasus Mountain Range in the Samegrelo-Zemo Svaneti region  of Georgia. The Range is connected to the Greater Caucasus Mountain Range via the Svaneti Range. The Range is bounded by the Tskhenistsqali River Valley to the east and the Enguri River Valley to the west.

Peaks that exceed  in elevation include Tsalmagi, Tekhurishdudi, Lakumurashdudi, Didghalidudi, Otepura and others. The name of the range is derived from the early medieval Georgian region of Egrisi, roughly equivalent to the Colchis of Classical Antiquity.

Geology 
Most of the Egrisi Range is composed of porphyritic rock that is of Jurassic Age. The southern periphery of the Range consists of Triassic limestones. There are many karst massives and caves in this portion of the Mountains. There are small glaciers and traces (remnants) of old glaciers at the highest elevations of the Range. Other lakes include Okhoja and Didi Tobavarchkhili.

Climate 
The northern slopes of the Egrisi Range receive  of annual precipitation. Most of the mountains are covered by significant amounts of snow in the colder months.

In the center of the Range near the head of the Tekhuri river at an elevation of 1600 meters is the Lebarde balneological resort. It was originally set up in the Soviet era, but has since been more or less abandoned, operating with limited infrastructure. In 2019 a new road leading to Lebarde was announced for further development of the area with sanatoriums, hotels and ropeways.

Vegetation
The endemic and endangered Megrelian Birch (Betula megrelica) grows in a few locations in the mountains. A significant portion of Georgia's temperate rain forests are located within the Egrisi Range. The highest reaches of the Range are covered by subalpine and alpine meadows.

References

Mountain ranges of Georgia (country)